Rau is a town in India.

Rau or RAU may also refer to:

Places
 The IOC code for the now defunct United Arab Republic (République arabe unie)
 Rau (Tanzanian ward), in the Moshi district of the Kilimanjaro Region, Tanzania
 Rau (Vidhan Sabha constituency), Madhya Pradesh, India

People
 Alan S. Rau, American lawyer
 B. N. Rau (1887–1953), Indian civil servant, co-drafter of the constitutions of India and Burma 
 Christian Rau (known by the latinisation "Ravis"), 17th century German orientalist
 Cornelia Rau, unlawfully detained immigrant to Australia
 Doug Rau (born 1948), American baseball player
 Gretchen Rau (1939–2006), American film set decorator
 Heinrich Rau (1899–1961), East German statesman
 Ines Rau (born 1990), French model, first openly transgender Playmate of the Month
 John Rau (born 1959), Australian barrister and politician
 Johannes Rau (1931–2006), President of Germany, 1999–2004
 K. Ananda Rau (1893–1966), Indian mathematician
 Karl Heinrich Rau (1792–1870), German political economist
 Kereopa Te Rau (died 1872), leader of the Māori Pai Mārire movement
  (1886–1966), Belgian sculptor and coin engraver
 Okka Rau (born 1977), German beach volleyball player 
 Reinhold Rau (1932–2006), South African natural historian and founder of the Quagga Project
 Thomas Rau (born 1984), German Paralympic table tennis player
 Tobias Rau (born 1981), German footballer
 Virgínia Rau (1907–1973), Portuguese archaeologist and historian
 Zbigniew Rau (born 1955), Polish politician, lawyer, diplomat and Minister of Foreign Affairs

Universities
 Rand Afrikaans University, a defunct university in Johannesburg, South Africa
 Royal Agricultural University, in Cirencester, England

Other uses
 Rau (novel), a 1972 novel by N. S. Inamdar
 Railway Union, a trade union in Finland
 Rau Le Creuset, a character from the anime Mobile Suit Gundam SEED

See also
 Rao (disambiguation)
 Raw (disambiguation)